The canton of Pouilly-sur-Loire is an administrative division of the Nièvre department, central France. Its borders were modified at the French canton reorganisation which came into effect in March 2015. Its seat is in Pouilly-sur-Loire.

It consists of the following communes:
 
Annay
Arquian
Bitry
Bouhy
Bulcy
Cessy-les-Bois
Châteauneuf-Val-de-Bargis
Ciez
Colméry
Couloutre
Dampierre-sous-Bouhy
Donzy
Garchy
Menestreau
Mesves-sur-Loire
Neuvy-sur-Loire
Perroy
Pouilly-sur-Loire
Saint-Amand-en-Puisaye
Saint-Andelain
Sainte-Colombe-des-Bois
Saint-Laurent-l'Abbaye
Saint-Malo-en-Donziois
Saint-Martin-sur-Nohain
Saint-Quentin-sur-Nohain
Saint-Vérain
Suilly-la-Tour
Tracy-sur-Loire
Vielmanay

References

Cantons of Nièvre